Sunley is a surname. Notable people with the surname include:

Bernard Sunley (1910–1964), British property developer
Dave Sunley (born 1952), English footballer
John Sunley (1946–2009), English cricketer
Mark Sunley (born 1971), English footballer

See also
Sulley (disambiguation)